Anixia buxi is a species of fungus belonging to the Anixia genus. It was documented in 1882. Its basionym is Orbicula buxi, which belongs to the Orbicula genus, but its taxonomy is uncertain.

References  

Agaricomycetes
Fungi described in 1882